William Spooner may refer to:
 William Spooner, ancestor of Lysander Spooner, who arrived at Plymouth Colony in 1637
 William Archibald Spooner (1844–1930), professor of spoonerism fame
 William Spooner (priest) (1778–1857), Archdeacon of Coventry
 William Wycliffe Spooner (1882–1967), founded the Spooner Dryer and Engineering Company
 Bill Spooner (politician) (1897–1966), Australian federal politician
 Bill Spooner (born 1949), musician